The 2001 season of Úrvalsdeild was the 90th season of male league football in the top tier division in Iceland. The season was contested by 10 teams, where ÍA won their 18th championship. ÍA's Hjörtur Hjartarson was the top scorer with 15 goals.

Final league position

Results
Each team played every opponent once home and away for a total of 18 matches.

References

Úrvalsdeild karla (football) seasons
1
Iceland
Iceland